The recent and current politics of the U.S. state of California are complex and involve a number of entrenched interests.  (For historical politics, see Politics of California before 1900). The first presidential election the state participated in was 1852. For the next few decades after the Civil War, California was a Republican-leaning but a very competitive state in presidential elections, as in voted for the nationwide winner all but thrice between statehood and 1912, with the exceptions of 1880, 1884, and 1912. Beginning with the 1916 election, the state shifted into a bellwether. Between 1916 and 1948, it voted for the nationwide winner every time, and was critical to Democratic victories in 1916 and 1948, as well.  

Franklin Roosevelt carried all but one county in the state in 1932, and in 1936 all counties. Roosevelt's third and fourth presidential elections saw him win by smaller margins. In 1948, the state narrowly voted for Truman. Beginning with the 1952 presidential election California became a Republican-leaning battleground state, as it only voted Democratic once (in 1964) over the next 36 years. Beginning with the 1992 presidential election, California has become increasingly Democratic. The state has voted Democratic in every presidential election since then, usually by lopsided margins, and starting in 2008, Democrats have consistently gotten at least 60% of the vote. Voting patterns since 1992 have remained consistent by and large, with Democratic presidential candidates carrying the coastal counties and Republicans the inland counties, though Democrats have gained in many Southern counties as well.

At the state level, California has had more mixed voting tendencies until more recently. Six of the state's first seven governors were Democrats; during subsequent decades, control of the governorship frequently shifted between the two parties. From 1899 to 1939, almost all governors were Republican, but since that time the governorship has switched parties regularly. The 2018 election marked the first time Democrats won more than two consecutive gubernatorial elections in the state's history.

Government

The Big Five is an informal institution of the legislative leadership role in California's government, consisting of the governor, the Assembly speaker, the Assembly minority leader, the Senate president pro tempore, and the Senate minority leader. Members of the Big Five meet in private to discuss bills pending in the legislature. Because the party caucus leaders in California's legislature also control the party's legislative campaign funds, the leaders wield tremendous power over their caucus members. They are thus able to exert some influence in their caucus's votes in Big Five meetings.

Electoral system 

Only the Democratic Party and Republican Party currently have representation in the State Legislature.  However, for a brief period around the turn of the 21st century, one member of the Green Party was a member of the State Assembly, representing the eastern San Francisco Bay Area.

California currently uses the nonpartisan blanket primary in its elections, where candidates regardless of party, including multiple nominees from a single party, contest the ballot and the candidates with the two highest numbers of votes are entered into a general election, but some municipalities such as San Francisco and Berkeley have opted to use a system of preferential voting, currently used in Australia and Ireland, more popularly known in the United States as instant-runoff voting or ranked choice voting.

Local elections in California at the county and city level are officially non-partisan and political party affiliations are not included on local election ballots, and if one candidate fails to have a majority on the first ballot, a runoff between the two highest-scoring candidates occurs.

Political parties

The two major political parties in California that currently have representation in the State Legislature and U.S. Congress are the Democratic Party and the Republican Party.  There are four other parties that qualify for official ballot status: the American Independent Party, Green Party, Libertarian Party, and Peace and Freedom Party. There are also other minor parties in California that are not ballot qualified including the American Solidarity Party, National Party and Reform Party.

Political issues
Many of California's governmental agencies, institutions, and programs have been established in the Constitution of California.  Additionally, the state constitution establishes mandatory funding levels for some agencies, programs and institutions.  This issue came to the forefront when Governor Arnold Schwarzenegger and the California Legislature attempted to cut spending to close the state's multibillion-dollar budget deficits during the 2000s.  Consequently, affected agencies with support from special interest groups, successfully pressed the California Supreme Court to order the restoration of funding to a number of agencies and programs which had been cut.

There have been several events, many dubbed "constitutional crises" by their opponents, over the last thirty-two years including:
the passage of term limits for the California legislature and elected constitutional officers, which was hotly argued statewide, and debated in the Supreme Court of California;
a test of the ratification process for the Supreme Court, in which a liberal chief justice, Rose Bird, and two liberal associate Justices, Joseph Grodin and Cruz Reynoso, were ousted;
a full-fledged tax revolt, "Proposition 13", which resulted in the freezing of real estate tax rates at 1% of the property's last sale price (plus a modest 2% maximum annual inflator);
a test of the state recall provision, in which Governor Gray Davis was recalled in a 2003 special election.
a failure to pass a budget until almost three months after the constitutional deadline (2008).

Northern California's inland areas and the Central Valley are mostly Republican areas. Historically, parts of Southern California, such as Orange County and Riverside County were Republican bastions, however, they have continued to trend Democratic in recent decades, with all five congressional districts flipping Democrat in 2018. Coastal California, including such areas as the Bay Area, Los Angeles, San Diego and Sacramento areas are mostly Democratic areas. As most of the population is in Southern California and the San Francisco Bay Area, California as a whole tends to be liberal.

California was once a Republican-leaning swing state in presidential elections from 1952 until 1992. During this period, the Republicans won California in every election except the election of 1964, often by a margin similar to the national one. In these years, the GOP nominated a couple of Californians as presidential candidates during four presidential elections: Richard Nixon in 1960 and 1972, and Ronald Reagan in 1980 and 1984. Since then, however, the Democrats have carried the electoral rich state since 1992. The immigration of Hispanic Americans and Asian Americans and the migration of northern liberals, who tend to vote Democratic, shifted the balance in favor of the Democratic Party.

Among the state's divisive issues are water and water rights, resulting in the California Water Wars. Lacking reliable dry season rainfall, water is limited, and available surface sources are extensively developed through dams, canals, and pipelines. The principal water sources are mountain runoff from wet season rains and higher altitude snowpack (70%), wells (limited by salt-water incursion and overuse), and some Colorado River water supplying Southern California (strictly limited by treaties with the other western states and Mexico). Waste water reclamation in California is already routine (for irrigation and industrial use).  Most water is in the north of the State, while agriculture, the largest user of stored water in California, is most prevalent in the central and southern areas. Additionally, the majority of the state's population is in the south.  Water viewed as excess by the south is viewed by the north as environmentally essential for agriculture, fisheries, and wildlife. While the southern electorate has a greater portion of the population it is not as unified in its viewpoint as is that of the north, so ballot propositions such as those promoting a Peripheral Canal to transport water to the south have failed.

Land use is also divisive.  High land prices mean that ordinary people keep a large proportion of their net worth inland.  This leads them to agitate strongly about issues that can affect the prices of their home or investments.  The most vicious local political battles concern local school boards (good local schools substantially raise local housing prices) and local land-use policies.  In built-up areas, it is extremely difficult to site new airports, dumps, or jails. Many cities routinely employ eminent domain to make land available for development.  A multi-city political battle was fought for several years in Orange County concerning the decommissioning of the huge El Toro Marine airbase.  Orange County needs a new airport (pilot unions voted the existing airport, John Wayne, the least safe in the U.S.), but the noise could reduce land prices throughout the southern part of the county, including wealthy, politically powerful Irvine.

Gun control is another divisive issue, which stems at least partially from the fact that California's constitution does not explicitly guarantee the right for ordinary citizens to keep and bear arms.  In the cities, California has one of the U.S.'s most serious gang problems, and in some farming regions, some of the highest murder rates.  The state also contains many individuals who desire to keep and bear arms in defense of themselves, their families, and property.  The legislature has passed restrictive gun control laws.  Private purchase of assault weapons (generally, semi-automatic rifles that look like military rifles) without prior approval from the state Department of Justice (which rarely grants such approval) is a felony.  The law does not, however, prohibit sales of semi-automatic hunting-style civilian weapons, leading many to question the effectiveness of the cosmetic distinction.  Pistols may be purchased and kept in one's home or place of business (however, they are required to be registered to the state and must be considered a "safe" handgun (see AB 1471), but it is illegal to carry weapons or ammunition outside these areas without a concealed weapons permit, except in a locked area (car trunk) to licensed practice ranges or other legitimate uses (hunting, repair, collection, etc.) Open carry of an unloaded firearm in some areas is legal but very uncommon due to the confusing web of state and federal laws, such as the Federal Gun-Free School Zones Act of 1990, which makes it a felony to carry a gun within 1000 feet of a school, even without malicious intent. As of 2012, open carry of firearms is for the most part banned, with exceptions made for law enforcement, hunters, and individuals in rural areas of the state. Except in a handful of rural counties, most people find it impossible to get concealed weapons permits since they are issued at the discretion of the local law enforcement officials; California is not a "shall issue" state for concealed weapons permits. Because of the importance of local law enforcement's discretion, some counties are nevertheless virtually "shall issue" while others are de facto "no issue", leading to the peculiar situation of rural residents of one jurisdiction being able to legally carry their handguns in areas where the local residents cannot. For more see gun laws in California.

Influence of special-interest groups
Because California is the most populous state in the United States, legislation and policies that are enacted by the government of California often have significant implications on major political issues at the national level.  Throughout the twentieth century, political decisions in California have wielded substantial influence with Congress while considering legislation at the federal level.  Because of the potentially nationwide implications for political decisions made in California, special-interest groups, many of which are based outside of California, play a greater role in California politics than in most other states, by contributing large amounts of money into lobbying, litigation, and producing media advertisements to influence voters and elected officials on major political issues.  The California Fair Political Practices Commission regulates campaign finance and lobbying in California.

California's Federal Representation

The most populous state, California has the largest Congressional delegation of any state, with 52 representatives and two senators. In the 118th Congress, 40 of California's seats are held by Democrats and 12 are held by Republicans. There are as follows:

California's 1st congressional district represented by Doug LaMalfa (R)
California's 2nd congressional district represented by Jared Huffman (D)
California's 3rd congressional district represented by Kevin Kiley (R)
California's 4th congressional district represented by Mike Thompson (D)
California's 5th congressional district represented by Tom McClintock (R)
California's 6th congressional district represented by Ami Bera (D)
California's 7th congressional district represented by Doris Matsui (D)
California's 8th congressional district represented by John Garamendi (D)
California's 9th congressional district represented by Josh Harder (D)
California's 10th congressional district represented by Mark DeSaulnier (D)
California's 11th congressional district represented by Nancy Pelosi (D)
California's 12th congressional district represented by Barbara Lee (D)
California's 13th congressional district represented by John Duarte (R)
California's 14th congressional district represented by Eric Swalwell (D)
California's 15th congressional district represented by Kevin Mullen (D)
California's 16th congressional district represented by Anna Eshoo (D)
California's 17th congressional district represented by Ro Khanna (D)
California's 18th congressional district represented by Zoe Lofgren (D)
California's 19th congressional district represented by Jimmy Panetta (D)
California's 20th congressional district represented by Kevin McCarthy (R)
California's 21st congressional district represented by Jim Costa (D)
California's 22nd congressional district represented by David Valadao (R)
California's 23rd congressional district represented by Jay Obernolte (R)
California's 24th congressional district represented by Salud Carbajal (D)
California's 25th congressional district represented by Raul Ruiz (D)
California's 26th congressional district represented by Julia Brownley (D)
California's 27th congressional district represented by Mike Garcia (R)
California's 28th congressional district represented by Judy Chu (D)
California's 29th congressional district represented by Tony Cárdenas (D)
California's 30th congressional district represented by Adam Schiff (D)
California's 31st congressional district represented by Grace Napolitano (D)
California's 32nd congressional district represented by Brad Sherman (D)
California's 33rd congressional district represented by Pete Aguilar (D)
California's 34th congressional district represented by Jimmy Gomez (D)
California's 35th congressional district represented by Norma Torres (D)
California's 36th congressional district represented by Ted Lieu (D)
California's 37th congressional district represented by Sydney Kamlager-Dove (D)
California's 38th congressional district represented by Linda Sánchez (D)
California's 39th congressional district represented by Mark Takano (D)
California's 40th congressional district represented by Young Kim (R)
California's 41st congressional district represented by Ken Calvert (R)
California's 42nd congressional district represented by Robert Garcia (D)
California's 43rd congressional district represented by Maxine Waters (D)
California's 44th congressional district represented by Nanette Barragán (D)
California's 45th congressional district represented by Michelle Steel (R)
California's 46th congressional district represented by Lou Correa (D)
California's 47th congressional district represented by Katie Porter (D)
California's 48th congressional district represented by Darrell Issa (R)
California's 49th congressional district represented by Mike Levin (D)
California's 50th congressional district represented by Scott Peters (D)
California's 51st congressional district represented by Sara Jacobs (D)
California's 52nd congressional district represented by Juan Vargas (D)

California's two Democratic Senators are Dianne Feinstein and Alex Padilla, serving since 1992 and 2021, respectively. 

California is part of the United States District Court for the Northern District of California, the United States District Court for the Central District of California, the United States District Court for the Southern District of California, and the United States District Court for the Eastern District of California in the federal judiciary. The district's cases are appealed to the San Franscico-based United States Court of Appeals for the Ninth Circuit.

Notable people
 
 
 
 Stephen C. Bowers, served in the California legislature
 John T. Campbell, served in the California legislature
 John T. Crenshaw, served in the California legislature
 Robert Desty, served in the California legislature
 John M. James, a member of the 1867-1869 California State Assembly
 Charles H. Johnson, a member of the 1861–1862 California State Assembly
 Frank D. Laughlin, served in the California legislature
 James H. Lawrence, served in the California legislature
 Smyth M. Miles, served in the California legislature
 Joseph C. Montague, served in the California legislature
 Miguel D. Pedrorena, served in the California legislature
 Paul Shirley, served in the California legislature
 Frederick A. Snyder, served in the California legislature
 Jacob R. Snyder, served in the California legislature
 Bruce R. Stannard, served in the California legislature
 William H. Stone, served in the California legislature
 David C. Williams, served in the California legislature

See also
Politics of California before 1900
Government of California
California locations by voter registration
Political party strength in California
Electoral reform in California
League of California Cities, a lobbying group representing most of the city governments
Student Senate for California Community Colleges, a lobbying organization, authorized by state statute

References

External links

Archival collections
Guide to the California Political Publication and Ephemera Collection. Special Collections and Archives, The UC Irvine Libraries, Irvine, California.

Other

Deep Cuts Threaten to Reshape California by Jennifer Steinhauer, The New York Times, May 30, 2009
TotalCapitol.com California political news and database of people in California politics
 

 
History of California